The Moutere River is a river of the Tasman Region of New Zealand's South Island. It flows north from its origins southwest of Māpua, reaching Tasman Bay / Te Tai-o-Aorere at the Moutere Inlet, a tidal lagoon three kilometres south of Motueka.

See also
List of rivers of New Zealand

References

Rivers of the Tasman District
Rivers of New Zealand